John Francis Spellar (born 5 August 1947) is a British politician who has served as Member of Parliament (MP) for Warley, formerly Warley West, since 1992. A member of the Labour Party, he previously represented Birmingham Northfield from 1982 to 1983. He served as a minister in numerous departments between 1997 and 2005 and later served as Comptroller of the Household in the Whips' Office between 2008 and 2010. After Labour entered opposition, he served as a shadow Foreign Office minister from 2010 to 2015.

Early life
Spellar was born in Bromley and educated at Dulwich College and St Edmund Hall, Oxford. He was Chairman of the Oxford University Labour Club in 1967.

Spellar was the Political Officer of the Electrical, Electronic, Telecommunications and Plumbing Union (EETPU) from 1969 to 1992, and was a speech-writer for general secretaries Frank Chapple and Eric Hammond. As a young union officer he attended, along with John Golding and Roger Godsiff, the St Ermin's group of senior trade union leaders who organised to prevent the Bennite left taking over the party in the years 1981–1987.

He was a councillor in the London Borough of Bromley between 1970 and 1974.

Parliamentary career
Spellar stood for the constituency of Bromley at the 1970 general election as Labour's youngest candidate.

He was first elected to the House of Commons in the 1982 Birmingham Northfield by-election but lost at the 1983 General Election to the Conservative candidate, Roger King. At the 1987 general election he stood again for the same seat but was again unsuccessful against Roger King. Spellar returned to the House of Commons in the 1992 general election becoming the MP for Warley West with a majority of 5,472, and was appointed an opposition whip. Following a period as opposition spokesman for Northern Ireland in 1994, he was moved to shadow Defence minister in 1995.

In 1997, Warley West was abolished and Spellar was selected to stand for Warley, which he won in that year with a majority of 15,451.

When Tony Blair formed his government in 1997, Spellar was appointed Parliamentary Under-Secretary of State at the Ministry of Defence, being promoted to become Minister of State for the Armed Forces in 1999. In 2001, he was appointed to the Privy Council, as Minister of State for Transport in the Department for Transport, Local Government and the Regions with rights to attend Cabinet. After the 2002 reshuffle, he became Minister of State at the Department for Transport, and moved to the Northern Ireland Office in 2003. He was banned from the offices of both the Mayor of Derry and the Mayor of Belfast during that year, because he supported the reinstatement to the British Army of convicted murderers Mark Wright and James Fisher of the Scots Guards. He left the front benches in 2005, but in 2008, he rejoined the government as a whip (Comptroller of the Household) and served until Labour entered opposition in May 2010.

In November 2015, he suggested on BBC Radio 5 Live that his party leader Jeremy Corbyn should resign over the question of whether to conduct air strikes on ISIL in Syria, saying: "What we're seeing here is an attempted coup by Jeremy Corbyn and the people around him in the bunker trying to take over the party. It's unacceptable. How does Jeremy Corbyn and his tiny band of Trots in the bunker think they've got the unique view on it all? If anyone should resign after this incident, it should be Jeremy Corbyn." He supported Owen Smith in the 2016 Labour leadership election.

Spellar is a vice-chair of Labour Friends of Israel. He is a Director of the centre-left Labour grouping, Labour First and also of the Henry Jackson Society Advisory Council.

In June 2016, Spellar raised a formal objection to a parliamentary order creating the West Midlands Combined Authority, delaying its creation, because its size had been increased since its proposal and Spellar believed its funding was not clear.

Spellar supported continued membership of the European Union in the 2016 Brexit referendum.

In March 2019, Spellar was the only Labour MP to vote against allowing compulsory LGBT education in schools, prompting criticism from the Liberal Democrats and LGBT Labour. He apologised two weeks later, highlighting the fact that he had made a mistake and was misguided.

In July 2021, he introduced a private Members Bill to recognise the Armenian genocide.

Spellar is a supporter of domestic vaccine passports during the COVID-19 pandemic and criticised the decision to hold a review into the possibility of adopting them, stating that this shows "no sense of urgency".

Private life
Spellar was married to dentist Anne Wilmot from 1981 until her death in 2003. They had one daughter.

References

External links

John Spellar official site

|-

|-

|-

|-

|-

1947 births
Living people
Alumni of St Edmund Hall, Oxford
Councillors in the London Borough of Bromley
Electrical, Electronic, Telecommunications and Plumbing Union-sponsored MPs
Labour Party (UK) MPs for English constituencies
Labour Friends of Israel
Members of the Privy Council of the United Kingdom
Northern Ireland Office junior ministers
People educated at Dulwich College
People from Bromley
UK MPs 1979–1983
UK MPs 1992–1997
UK MPs 1997–2001
UK MPs 2001–2005
UK MPs 2005–2010
UK MPs 2010–2015
UK MPs 2015–2017
UK MPs 2017–2019
UK MPs 2019–present